Saina Al-Humaidi (also spelled Snay Lehmaidi) is a village in the municipality of Umm Salal in Qatar. The village has been inhabited primarily by the Al-Humaidi tribe for several decades.

Etymology
In Arabic, "sana" is a term used to denote an area where water accumulates. The term may also refer to the type of wood used in a barrier enclosing a water reservoir.

Infrastructure
The number of housing units stand at about 15, all being owned by the Al-Humaidi. There is a mosque in the area, called "Smra Bin Muawiya". The village is typified by poor sanitation and a lack of facilities. Resident typically travel to Umm Qarn, 2 km away, to purchase products.

References 

Populated places in Umm Salal